The Central District of Malard County is in Tehran province, Iran. At the National Census in 2006, the region's population (as the former Malard Rural District and the city of Malard in Shahriar County) was 256,152 in 68,267 households. The following census in 2011 counted 333,772 people in 97,204 households, by which time the rural district and city had been separated from the county and Malard County established. At the latest census in 2016, the district had 324,788 inhabitants in 99,644 households.

References 

Malard County

Districts of Tehran Province

Populated places in Tehran Province

Populated places in Malard County